Yellow Pills: Prefill is the fourth release by The Numero Group. Compiled with the help of Jordan Oakes, Yellow Pills takes a look at some overlooked pop tracks from 1979-1982.

Track listing
Side A
 "Green Hearts" - Luxury
 "I Need That Record" - Tweeds
 "All I Want" - Colors
 "You Need Pop" - Speedies
 "Like I Told You" - Shoes
 "In and Out of Love" - Sponsors
 "Not My Girl Anymore" - Bats
 "She's The Girl (Who Said No)" - Tweeds
 "Somebody Else's Girl" - Randy Winburn
 "One in a Million" - Luxury
 "Sun" - Toms
 "Countdown" - Luxury
 "Rave It Up" - Colors
 "1-2-3" - Speedies
 "Hey Little Girl" - Kids
 "Mr. Peculiar" - Bats
Side B
 "(I Wanna Be A) Teen Again" - Toms
 "Not Easy For Me" - Bats
 "Julie-Anne" - Treble Boys
 "Dream Rocker" - Tommy Rock
 "Love I Can't Wait" - Sponsors
 "Growing Up American" - Colors
 "Hello Mr. Jenkins" Finns
 "Things I Am" - Tactics
 "One Kiss" - Treble Boys
 "She's Hi-Fi" - Trend
 "Forever Through the Sun" - LMNOP
 "Good Time Music" - Jack Stack A Track
 "Sunshine U.S.A." - Randy Winburn
 "House Of Horrors" - Toms
 "Long Time Away" - Brat
 "There Goes My Heart Again" - Kids
 "(I Feel Like A) Dictionary" - Trend

References

External links
 http://www.gullbuy.com/buy%5C2005%5C4_12/yellowpills.cfm
 http://www.numerogroup.com/press.php?category=Numero%20004

2005 compilation albums
The Numero Group compilation albums